Vasyl Mykhailovych Chudnov (born 14 January 1958, in Kosmach, Kosiv Raion, Ukraine) is a Ukrainian politician. In 2013 to 2014, he was a leading figure in a political life of Prykarpattia.

Chudnov was born in Kosmach. In 2001-2010 he worked as a director for such companies as "Halychyna – Lis" and "Halychynabud".

In 2010-2012 Chudnov was a people's deputy of Ukraine. In 2013-2014 he was a head of the Ivano-Frankivsk Oblast State Administration (Governor of Prykarpattia). Due to mass protests in support for Euromaidan, he resigned.

References

External links
 New head of the Ivano-Frankivsk Oblast State Administration became Vasyl Chudnov (Новим головою Івано-Франківської ОДА став Василь Чуднов). Vikna. 7 November 2013

1958 births
Living people
People from Ivano-Frankivsk Oblast
Party of Regions politicians
Governors of Ivano-Frankivsk Oblast
Sixth convocation members of the Verkhovna Rada